The European Transport Workers' Federation (ETF) represents over 5 million transport workers from more than 200 transport unions across Europe, from the European Union, the European Economic Area, and Central and Eastern Europe, in over 30 countries.

ETF's work is driven by its vision for Fair Transport: quality jobs with safe, reliable transport services for customers.

Leadership

Presidents
1999: Wilhelm Haberzettl
2009: Graham Stevenson
2012: Lars Lindgren
2017: Frank Moreels

General Secretaries
1999: Doro Zinke
2005: Eduardo Chagas
2019: Livia Spera

References

External links 
 

Maritime organizations
Aviation organizations
European Trade Union Confederation
Organizations established in 1999